Emamzadeh Pahlavan (also Romanized as Emāmzādeh Pahlavān; also known as Emāmzādeh Pīrpahlavān) is a village in Dehdasht-e Sharqi Rural District, in the Central District of Kohgiluyeh County, Kohgiluyeh and Boyer-Ahmad Province, Iran. At the 2006 census, its population was 149, in 29 families.

References 

Populated places in Kohgiluyeh County